João de Oliveira (born 22 May 1906) was a Portuguese footballer who played as a forward.

External links 
 

1906 births
Portuguese footballers
Association football forwards
S.L. Benfica footballers
Portugal international footballers
Year of death missing
Place of birth missing